Rodolfo Martín Ferrando (born 12 January 1979, in Salto) is a Uruguayan professional footballer. He currently plays for Santiago Morning.

References

External links
 Profile at Terra.cl 

1979 births
Living people
Uruguayan footballers
Association football goalkeepers
Montevideo Wanderers F.C. players
Liverpool F.C. (Montevideo) players
Sportivo Cerrito players
C.A. Cerro players
Rangers de Talca footballers
Santiago Morning footballers
Cobresal footballers
Expatriate footballers in Chile
Footballers from Salto, Uruguay